Godwin Mathumo (born 31 May 1978) is a Botswana male badminton player.

Achievements

BWF International Challenge/Series
Men's Doubles

 BWF International Challenge tournament
 BWF International Series tournament
 BWF Future Series tournament

References

External links 
 

Living people
1978 births
Botswana male badminton players